Nothing's Sacred (stylized as NOTHING$ $ACRED on the album cover) is the fifth studio album by American thrash metal band Lȧȧz Rockit. It was released in 1991 on Roadrunner Records/Enigma Records and follows 1989's Annihilation Principle. It is the only release to feature 3 different members. This was thought to be the last album until 2008's Left for Dead.

Track listing

Credits
 Michael Coons – lead vocals
 Aaron Jellum – guitars
 Ken Savich – guitars
 Scott Dominguez – bass
 Dave Chavarri – drums
 Paul Bostaph – drums on "Necropolis"

Production
 Mark DeVito – layout (re-created)
 Michael Rosen – producer, engineering, mixing
 Vincent Wojno – engineering (assistant)
 Jeff Weller – executive producer
 Tom Coyne – mastering
 Jeff "Ski" Sadowski – cover art, artwork
 Ace Cook – executive producer
 Juan Urteaga – remastering
 Neil Zlozower – photography
 William Hames – photography (Japan version)

References

External links
BNR Metal band page

1991 albums
Lȧȧz Rockit albums